Abdelhakim Amokrane (born May 10, 1994) is an Algerian footballer who plays for Algerian Ligue Professionnelle 1 club Al-Shorta SC.

International career
In July 2015, Amokrane scored a brace for the Algeria under-23 national team in a 2–0 win over Sierra Leone in the first leg of their third round match-up in the 2015 CAF U-23 Championship qualifiers.

Honours
ES Sétif
 CAF Champions League: 2014

References

External links
 

1994 births
Algerian footballers
Algerian Ligue Professionnelle 1 players
Algerian Ligue 2 players
Algeria under-23 international footballers
DRB Tadjenanet players
ES Sétif players
ESM Koléa players
Living people
2015 Africa U-23 Cup of Nations players
People from Oum El Bouaghi Province
MO Béjaïa players
Association football forwards
21st-century Algerian people